The Seventh Oklahoma Legislature was a meeting of the legislative branch of the government of Oklahoma, composed of the Oklahoma Senate and the Oklahoma House of Representatives. The Oklahoma State Capitol, which was completed on June 30, 1917, was now available to state legislators The building was completed on June 30, 1917. They met in regular session from January 7 to March 29, 1919, during the first year of the term of Governor James B.A. Robertson. Among the newly elected members of the Oklahoma House of Representatives was George B. Schwabe, who would soon serve as the first Republican Speaker of the Oklahoma House of Representatives.

Lieutenant Governor Martin E. Trapp served as the President of the Senate, R. L. Davidson served as the President pro tempore of the Oklahoma Senate, and Tom Waldrep served as Speaker of the Oklahoma House of Representatives.

Dates of session
January 7-March 29, 1919
Previous: 6th Legislature • Next: 8th Legislature

Major events
The Oklahoma State Capitol, which was completed on June 30, 1917, was used by the state legislature for the first time during the 1919 session.

Party composition

Senate

House of Representatives

Leadership

Senate
Lieutenant Governor Martin E. Trapp served as the President of the Senate, which gave him a tie-breaking vote and allowed him to serve as a presiding officer. R.L. Davidson was elected by state senators to serve as the President pro tempore of the Oklahoma Senate, the primary presiding officer of the Oklahoma Senate.

House
Tom Waldrep served as Speaker of the Oklahoma House of Representatives.

Members

Senate

Table based on state almanac.

House of Representatives

Table based on government database.

References

External links
Oklahoma Legislature
Oklahoma House of Representatives
Oklahoma Senate

Oklahoma legislative sessions
1919 in Oklahoma
1920 in Oklahoma
1919 U.S. legislative sessions
1920 U.S. legislative sessions